There are three flags of Hamburg, Germany. The Landesflagge (civil flag), the State flag of Hamburg (Staatsflagge) and the admiralty flag (Admiralitätsflagge) consist of the coat of arms of Hamburg on a red flag.

Overview
The civil flag shows a white castle with three towers on red background, which is used as a civil flag as a state flag for most purposes. (It was historically used as civil ensign as well.) The oldest seal with the castle is thought to date from 1241. The first flag featuring the current form was in the mid-16th century, although this was most probably a red field, a white escutcheon and red castle. After about 1623, the escutcheon began to be omitted, leaving a red castle on white or a white castle on red. It was only in 1751 that the white castle on red was decreed as the flag of Hamburg. 

The civil flag is free for use to everybody. The state flag of Hamburg is only used by the Senate of Hamburg as the head of state. This flag was created in 1897 on the occasion of the opening of the new town hall. The Admiralty flag of Hamburg is used only for state buildings connected to the navigation and at the jacks of boats of Hamburg's Water Constabulary, since there are no genuine warships under city command anymore. It portrays the admiralty coat of arms which have existed since 1642.

Flags of boroughs in Hamburg

See also
Coat of arms of Hamburg
 Flags of German states

References

External links

 

Flag
Flags of cities in Germany
Flags of states of Germany
Flag
Jacks (flags)
Red and white flags
Hamburg